Pollia rubiginosa is a species of sea snail, a marine gastropod mollusc in the family Pisaniidae.

Description
The shell size varies between 20 mm and 30 mm

Distribution
This species occurs in the Red Sea, in the Indian Ocean off Tanzania, Mozambique and Réunion and in the Pacific Ocean off the Philippines.

References

 Dautzenberg, Ph. (1929). Mollusques testacés marins de Madagascar. Faune des Colonies Francaises, Tome III
 Spry, J.F. (1961). The sea shells of Dar es Salaam: Gastropods. Tanganyika Notes and Records 56

External links
 

Pisaniidae
Gastropods described in 1846